Kristel Viigipuu (born August 19, 1990 in Tartu) is a former Estonian biathlete. She finished 18th in the 4×6 km relay and 83rd in the 7.5 km sprint at the 2010 Winter Olympics in Vancouver, British Columbia, Canada.

References

1990 births
Living people
Estonian female biathletes
Biathletes at the 2010 Winter Olympics
Olympic biathletes of Estonia
Sportspeople from Tartu